Kończyce may refer to the following places in Poland:
Kończyce, Lower Silesian Voivodeship (south-west Poland)
Kończyce, Kuyavian-Pomeranian Voivodeship (north-central Poland)
 Kończyce Małe, Silesian Voivodeship
 Kończyce Wielkie, Silesian Voivodeship
Kończyce, Lesser Poland Voivodeship (south Poland)
Kończyce, Subcarpathian Voivodeship (south-east Poland)

In the Czech Republic:
 Kunčice (Polish: Kończyce Wielkie), part of Ostrava
 Kunčičky (Polish: Kończyce Małe), part of Ostrava